Aass Brewery (Norwegian: Aass Bryggeri) is Norway's oldest brewery still active. Founded in 1834 in Drammen, Norway, the brewery's primary products are beer and aquavit. The company also produces a wide range of soft drinks. Aass was also co-owner of the Norwegian soda pop brand A/S Solo.

History
Originally a company dealing in timber, groceries, baking and brewing, the brewery was bought by farmer's son Poul Lauritz Aass in the 1860s. The brewery is still owned by the Aass family, which makes it one of Norway's few remaining independent breweries. As an independent, it has built up a reputation for high quality products and tasty beers, brewing strictly according to the German Purity Law (reinheitsgebot).

Drammensølets venner (the Friends of the Beer from Drammen) is an association that supports the brewery, arranging various events and publishing a newsletter about 4 times a year. It is the world's 2nd largest such association, currently boasting about 35,000 members.

Beers
Juleøl (strong seasonal Christmas beer), Pilsner, Fatøl, Classic (amber), Pale Ale, Bock Beer, Gull and a dark Munich-style lager called Aass Bayer. And many more.

References

External links
 Home page (Norwegian version)
 Home page (English version)
 Home page Drammens Ølets Venner

Breweries in Norway
Buildings and structures in Drammen
Companies established in 1834
Companies based in Drammen
Food and drink companies established in 1834
Soft drinks manufacturers
Norwegian companies established in 1834